Datuk Ding Kuong Hiing (born 20 January 1955) is a Malaysian politician who has served as Member of the Sarawak State Legislative Assembly (MLA) for Meradong since May 2016. Previously, he was the Member of the Parliament of Malaysia (MP) for Sarikei from March 2008 to May 2013.

Political career 
Ding was elected to Parliament in the 2008 election.  After defeating his opponent from the Democratic Action Party (DAP) by 51 votes, he survived a legal challenge to the election in the Election Court, and an appeal to the Federal Court. Before his election, Ding was a staffer to the Chief Minister of Sarawak. In the 2013 election, Ding lost the seat to the DAP's Andrew Wong Ling Biu by 505 votes.

Personal life 
Ding is an engineer by profession and is married with two children.

Election results

Honours
 :
 Commander of the Order of Meritorious Service (PJN) - Datuk (2016)

References

Malaysian engineers
Living people
1955 births
People from Sarawak
Malaysian politicians of Chinese descent
Malaysian Buddhists
Members of the Dewan Rakyat
Sarawak United Peoples' Party politicians
Commanders of the Order of Meritorious Service